George Cooper (1820 – 1876) was an English organist and music educator.

Born in Lambeth, Cooper was the son of organist George Cooper Sr (c.1783–1843). He succeeded his father as assistant organist at St Paul's Cathedral in 1838, having already substituted for his father periodically since 1832. He remained in that position for the rest of his life, also serving concurrently as organist at a variety of other smaller London churches. One of such positions was St Sepulchre-without-Newgate, where he was organist from 1843 to 1876, succeeding his father, and grandfather (c.1750–1799) in the post. From 1867 until his death 9 years later. he was the organist and choir master at the Chapel Royal, St. James's.

His students included Canadian organist Romain-Octave Pelletier I; English organists Edmund Chipp, Langdon Colborne, Walter Parratt, John Stainer and Henry Willis; English conductor Henry Wood; and Arthur Sullivan, English composer.

He died in Holborn, and his funeral was held in St. Paul's Cathedral.

Positions held 

 Organist of St Benet's, Paul's Wharf, 1833–1844
 Organist of SS Anne and Agnes, 1836–1844
 Assistant Organist of St Paul's Cathedral, 1838–1876
 Organist of St Sepulchre-without-Newgate, 1843–1876
 Organist and Choir Master of Christ's Hospital, 1844–1876
 Organist and Choir Master of Chapel Royal, St. James's, 1867–1876

References

Notes

1820 births
1876 deaths
19th-century organists
People from the London Borough of Lambeth
Cathedral organists
English organists
British male organists
British music educators
19th-century English musicians
19th-century British male musicians
19th-century classical musicians
Male classical organists